Maoritomella is a genus of sea snails, marine gastropod mollusks in the family Borsoniidae.

Description
The small shell seldom exceeds 10 mm and has usually a fusiform-biconical shape. The axial riblets in the bluntly domed protoconch are absent or restricted to the terminal half-whorl. The sculpture consists of strong spiral lirae or cords with fine collabral threads crossing spiral lirae. It often contains a peripheral keel but never a conspicuous shoulder angle. The siphonal canal is not or feebly indented. There is an anal sinus on the shoulder slope. An operculum is present. The marginal teeth of the radula are rather short, straight and awl-like

Distribution
This marine genus occurs off Indonesia, South Africa, Zanzibar, New Zealand and Australia (New South Wales, Queensland and South Australia).

Species
Species within the genus Maoritomella include:
 Maoritomella albula (Hutton, 1873) 
 Maoritomella clupeispina Kilburn, 1986 
 Maoritomella densecostulata Kilburn, 1986 
 Maoritomella eva (Thiele, 1925) 
 Maoritomella foliacea Laseron, 1954
 Maoritomella granilirata Kilburn, 1986 
 Maoritomella ischna (Watson, 1881)
 Maoritomella leptopleura Kilburn, 1986 
 Maoritomella megalacme Kilburn, 1986 
† Maoritomella moderata (Marwick, 1965) 
 Maoritomella multiplex (Webster, 1906)
 Maoritomella orientalis Dell, 1956 
 † Maoritomella pagodula Powell, 1942 
 Maoritomella pleonastica (Barnard, 1958) 
 † Maoritomella robusta Powell, 1942 
 † Maoritomella studiosorum (L. C. King, 1933) 
 † Maoritomella subalbula (R. Murdoch, 1900) 
 Maoritomella tarrhion Kilburn, 1986 
 † Maoritomella torquatella (Marwick, 1931) 
 Species brought into synonymy
 Maoritomella batjanensis (Schepman, 1913): synonym of Otitoma batjanensis (Schepman, 1913)
 Maoritomella thola Laseron, 1954: synonym of Tomopleura thola (Laseron, 1954)

References

 Powell, 1942 [Bulletin of the Auckland Institute and Museum, 2: 113]
 Laseron, C. 1954. Revision of the New South Wales Turridae (Mollusca). Australian Zoological Handbook. Sydney : Royal Zoological Society of New South Wales 1-56, pls 1-12.

External links
 Bouchet P., Kantor Yu.I., Sysoev A. & Puillandre N. (2011) A new operational classification of the Conoidea. Journal of Molluscan Studies 77: 273-308